Baymax! is an American superhero science fiction comedy series of short films created by Don Hall that premiered on Disney+ on June 29, 2022, featuring the Marvel Comics character of the same name. The series is a spinoff of the animated feature film Big Hero 6 (2014), and the second television series set in the film's continuity following Big Hero 6: The Series (2017–2021).  The series is the first television series produced by Walt Disney Animation Studios.

Synopsis
The series follows nurse robot Baymax as he helps people in the city of San Fransokyo.

Voice cast

Scott Adsit as Baymax, a robot created by Tadashi, Hiro's brother.
Ryan Potter as Hiro Hamada, a student at San Fransokyo Institute of Technology.
Maya Rudolph as Aunt Cass, Hiro's aunt
Zeno Robinson as Ali, Sofia's friend
Emily Kuroda as Kiko, a patient.
Lilimar as Sofia, a middle school patient
Jaboukie Young-White as Mbita

Brian Tee as Yukio

Episodes
All episodes are written by Cirocco Dunlap.

Production

Development
On December 10, 2020, Walt Disney Animation Studios chief creative officer Jennifer Lee announced during an Investor's Day livestream that a new show entitled Baymax!, based on the 2014 film Big Hero 6 is in development for Disney+. Big Hero 6 co-director Don Hall will serve as creator and co-executive producer, the latter alongside Lee, for the series. The idea for a Baymax series was pitched by Hall, who "thought it would be fun to do a Disney+ series with Baymax interacting with normal folks". He also wanted the series to center on Baymax due to feeling that its predecessor, Big Hero 6: The Series,  "had explored so many great roads" and characters within the franchise's universe. Big Hero 6 producer Roy Conli returns to produce.

It is the first television series to ever be produced by Walt Disney Animation Studios; and is also the first spinoff series to actually be produced by the studio itself, as most television series based on films in the Disney animated features canon - including Big Hero 6: The Series - are mainly done by Disney Television Animation. As such, the production team had to adapt to working in an episodic storytelling format, which Conli described as "a great exercise in storytelling" that gave the studio "the opportunity to tell stories in different ways". The producers also used the episodic format as a way to allow employees within the studio to make their directorial debuts. Several story artists from the film pitched approximately 20 ideas for stories, of which they picked 6 that followed a "thematic arc". Some of the artists who did pitches were hired to direct episodes based on their ideas.

Writing
The series centers on Baymax's main programming as a nurse robot, exploring the city of San Fransokyo and finding patients that "don't want to be helped", with series writer Cirocco Dunlap adding that their refusal comes from denial, stating that "[they're] scared, [they] don't want to face reality, [they] can't afford the consequences — the denial runs deep". Hall said that, through the series, Baymax attempts to help people with their physical ailments "and in the process, gets to a deeper, more emotional place" that allows his patients to grow as people. Associate producer Bradford Simonsen said they wanted Baymax to be good-intentioned but näive, and that the stories for every episode developed in unexpected yet heartfelt ways, and Hall described the series as centering on the relationship between Baymax and his patients. Hall's pitch for the series was more comedic in tone, with the more emotional aspects being added by Dunlap after he asked her to write the series. Both Hall and Conli felt Dunlap's contributions made the series closer in tone to the original film.

The producers wanted to depict the topics featured in each episode in a careful manner. For the third episode, they wanted to avoid depicting menstrual periods as shameful, with Dunlap describing its depiction as important to her. Similarly, for the fourth episode, they aimed to depict fish allergy as something alarming while audiences were still able to enjoy the episode. Unlike the film, the series does not feature superhero elements, with Hall instead wanting it to be more reminiscent of the medical procedurals he watched in his childhood.

Casting
On May 20, 2022, it was confirmed that Scott Adsit, Ryan Potter, and Maya Rudolph would reprise their roles as Baymax, Hiro, and Cass, respectively, while it was also announced that Zeno Robinson, Lilimar, Jaboukie Young-White, and Emily Kuroda joined the cast. Lilimar was cast after the producers heard her audition tape, after which they felt she was able to accurately portray the character's intelligence and age.

Animation
According to visual effects supervisor Mohit Kallianpur, the animators reused assets from Big Hero 6, but the data had to be updated due to changes in technology since the film's release. After converting the data, the animators tested it and treated any errors found. Conli further explained that the animators reused models from the first film when possible, and created new models when required.

For the designs for the new characters, the animators reused models featured in crowds within the original film. According to Simonsen, the process required coordination with the directors; while the directors were developing the story for each episode, the 
producers would give them a series of background characters they felt would fit the story, after which the directors would pick the model.

Music
Dominic Lewis, who previously provided additional music for the original film, composed the score for the series by May 2022. The soundtrack for the series was released on June 29, 2022.

Track listing

Release
Baymax! was released on June 29, 2022, on Disney+, and consists of six episodes. The first episode premiered on June 17, 2022, during the Annecy Film Festival.

Marketing
The teaser trailer was released by Walt Disney Animation Studios' YouTube channel on November 12, 2021, which was Disney+ Day. An official trailer was released on May 20, 2022, during the National Streaming Day.

Reception

Audience viewership 
According to Whip Media's viewership tracking app TV Time, Baymax! was the 5th most anticipated new television series of June 2022.

Critical response 
On the review aggregator website Rotten Tomatoes, the series holds a rating of 100% fresh based on 6 critics, with an average rating of 8.3/10.

Sam Stone of CBR.com felt creator and Big Hero 6 co-director Don Hall brought "the same attention to detail, effortless charm, and genuine heart" to the series as the original film, praising its emotional depth and short runtime, which Stone felt prevented the series from becoming formulaic. Jeff Ewing of Forbes described the series as "an unsurprisingly gorgeous season", calling the episodes "cute" and able to capture the titular character's charm, highlighting "Sofia" and "Mbita" as the series' "most touching episodes", and praising its animation and voice acting, though he felt the series was not able to properly expand the franchise's universe. Raven Brunner of Game Rant said that the series "embraces the naivety and wholeheartedness of adolescence while further developing the Big Hero 6 world" and that "is a delightful reintroduction" to the Big Hero 6 franchise. She also praised the final episode for allowing the stories from the previous episodes to "eventually [come] together in a way that is deeply reflective of the show's values", as well as the series' racial and LGBTQ+ diversity.

Polly Conway of Common Sense Media rated the series 4 out of 5 stars, praised the depiction of positive messages and role models, citing persistence and empathy, and complimented the diverse representations across the characters. Matt Fowler of IGN rated the first season of the series 8 out of 10, found agreeable the interactions between the characters, and praised the show for its humor and animation, writing, "Baymax! is light, fluffy short-form warmth that humorously fulfills our need to feel taken care of, watched after, and held accountable."

The third episode "Sofia" aroused controversy and criticism due to its depiction of a transgender man wearing a trans pride shirt and discussing his preferred type of tampon. Others praised the depiction.

Accolades

References

External links

2020s American animated television series
2020s American comic science fiction television series
2020s American LGBT-related comedy television series
2020s American LGBT-related animated television series
2020s American superhero comedy television series
2022 American television series debuts
American animated television spin-offs
American children's animated comic science fiction television series
American children's animated superhero television series
American computer-animated television series
American comedy web series
American sequel television series
Animated television series about robots
Animated television series based on Marvel Comics
Anime-influenced Western animated television series
English-language television shows
Disney controversies
Disney+ original programming
Disney animated television series
Big Hero 6 (franchise)
LGBT-related superhero television shows
Transgender in television
LGBT-related controversies in animation
LGBT-related controversies in television